Woodford Green is an area of Woodford in East London, England, within the London Borough of Redbridge. It adjoins Buckhurst Hill to the north, Woodford Bridge to the east, South Woodford to the south, and Chingford to the west.

It was a hamlet in the ancient parish of Woodford, in the historic county of Essex, becoming an urban district in 1894. For administrative purposes, this merged with the Wanstead Urban District to form the Wanstead and Woodford Urban District in 1934. In 1965, the urban district became part of the London Borough of Redbridge.

Toponymy
The locality takes its name from the Green, an area of open common land - a part of Epping Forest - besides which the area first developed.

Politics
Woodford Green is part of the Parliamentary Constituency of Chingford and Woodford Green, represented since its creation in 1997 by Iain Duncan Smith, leader of the Conservative Party from 2001 to 2003. He was Secretary of State for Work and Pensions from 2010 to 2016. Duncan Smith is a successor of Sir Winston Churchill, who was also MP for this area and is commemorated by a statue on Woodford Green erected in 1959.

In the 1920s and 1930s, Clement Attlee, later Labour Prime Minister from 1945 to 1951, lived in Woodford Green, the seat of his political adversary, Winston Churchill. A Blue Plaque records the fact on a house in Monkhams Avenue.

Sylvia Pankhurst lived in Woodford Green from 1924 to 1956, originally in the High Road, and from 1933 in Charteris Road. In 1935, Pankhurst commissioned and dedicated a memorial in Woodford High Road to the victims of Italian aerial bombing in Ethiopia, known as the Anti-Air War Memorial.

Sport

Cricket
Woodford Green Cricket Club was founded in 1735 and is the oldest cricket club in the world that still plays on the original ground alongside the High Road. The club has teams for all age groups with the senior teams playing in the Hamro Essex League.

Athletics
Woodford Green with Essex Ladies is one of the leading British athletics clubs and is based at Ashton Fields. The club topped Division 1 of the British Athletics League for the first time in 2005.

Education

Primary schools
Avon House Preparatory School (Independent)
Churchfields Infants School
Churchfields Junior School
Bancroft's Preparatory School
Ray Lodge Primary School
St Antony's Catholic Primary School
St Aubyn's School
Woodford Green Preparatory School
Wells Primary School
Woodford Green Primary
St. Joseph's Convent School
Roding Primary School

Secondary schools

Bancroft's School, Woodford Green, (Independent)
Trinity Catholic High School
Woodbridge High School
Woodford County High School for Girls

Special needs schools
Hatton School

Demography
Woodford Green is represented by the Monkhams electoral ward in the London Borough of Redbridge. It ranks as one of the highest income areas of Greater London.

Notable people

Clement Attlee, Labour Prime Minister (1945-1951)
Nick Browne, cricketer
Philip Burnell, cricketer
Winston Churchill, Prime Minister( 1940-1945 and 1951-1955 )
Harris Dickinson, actor.
Lynn Fontanne, actress.
James Hilton, author
Alfred Horsley Hinton, photographer
Stuart Kuttner, managing editor of the News of the World
Barry Lamb, experimental musician, composer
Louisa Leaman, author
Michael Norgrove, boxer
Kele Okereke, Bloc Party musician
Sylvia Pankhurst, suffragette
Tony Robinson, actor and TV personality
Alan Thurlow, organist
Kate Williams, actress, Woodford resident during the making of the TV series Love Thy Neighbour

Transport and locale

Roads and buses
The A104 runs through Woodford Green and forms its High Street while Chigwell Road, the A113, runs along the east side with Broadmead Road connecting the two. Woodford Green is served by Woodford tube station.

Various London Buses routes also connect Woodford Green with nearby major towns:

Nearest places
Chingford
South Woodford
Woodford Bridge
Woodford Wells
Wanstead
Loughton
Leytonstone
Roding Valley
Barkingside
Chigwell
Buckhurst Hill
Walthamstow
Highams Park
Clayhall

The nearest London Underground stations are Woodford, South Woodford and Roding Valley on the Central line.

See also
 St Thomas of Canterbury Church, Woodford Green

References

Areas of London
Districts of the London Borough of Redbridge